This is the results breakdown of the local elections held in Navarre on 22 May 2011. The following tables show detailed results in the autonomous community's most populous municipalities, sorted alphabetically.

Overall

City control
The following table lists party control in the most populous municipalities, including provincial capitals (shown in bold). Gains for a party are displayed with the cell's background shaded in that party's colour.

Municipalities

Barañain
Population: 21,705

Burlada
Population: 18,389

Egüés
Population: 14,354

Estella
Population: 14,207

Pamplona
Population: 197,488

Tafalla
Population: 11,413

Tudela
Population: 35,268

See also
2011 Navarrese regional election

References

Navarre
2011